Nymo is a surname. Notable people with the surname include:

Atle Nymo (born 1977), Norwegian musician
Frode Nymo (born 1975), Norwegian musician
Svein Nymo (1953–2014), Norwegian violinist and composer
Tor Nymo (born 1940), Norwegian politician 

Norwegian-language surnames